The Döllnitzbahn GmbH is a private railway company in Saxony in eastern Germany. It is the operator of the Oschatz–Mügeln–Kemmlitz/Glossen narrow gauge line in central Saxony.

History
In November 1993 the newly founded Döllnitzbahn GmbH took over the remaining lines of the Mügeln railway network between Oschatz, Mügeln and Kemmlitz. The primary aim of the company was initially the preservation of the remaining goods traffic from the kaolin mine at Kemmlitz. For that purpose used narrow gauge goods wagons were bought from the Mansfeld mining railway  and a new transshipment site to the standard gauge railway network was built in Oschatz. With the help of used PKP diesel locomotives, they succeeded initially in keeping the goods traffic going. In spite of this, the demand gradually fell so that goods services had to be closed in 2001. The Döllnitzbahn was the last narrow gauge railway in Saxony to run public freight services.

Today only school trains and steam-hauled 'specials' run on the Döllnitzbahn railway, e.g. for touristic purposes. There is a local private association responsible for the organisation of respective events.

Fleet List

Steam Locomotives

Diesel Locomotives & Railcars

External links 
 http://www.doellnitzbahn.de
 http://www.wilder-robert.de

Heritage railways in Germany
Railway lines in Saxony
Transport in Saxony
750 mm gauge railways in Germany